Hyrum State Park is a state park and reservoir in Cache County, Utah, United States.

Hyrum State Park is in the northeastern part of Utah. The park is used for fishing, boating, camping, picnicking, hiking, waterskiing, and swimming.

The park was named for Hyrum Smith, the brother of LDS church founder Joseph Smith.

Hyrum State Park's facilities are located at the northern shore of the reservoir, and include 31 RV campsites, restrooms, showers, a ranger station, boat ramp, dock, and trailheads.

The dam creating Hyrum Reservoir was completed in April, 1935, by the United States Bureau of Reclamation.  Prior to that, local settlers had dug a  canal from the Little Bear River to the town of Hyrum to irrigate their crops.

Fish in the reservoir include yellow perch, channel catfish, rainbow trout, largemouth bass, and bluegill.

References

External links
 Hyrum State Park
 Live WebCam - Hyrum State Park

Dams completed in 1935
Dams in Utah
Protected areas of Cache County, Utah
Protected areas established in 1959
State parks of Utah
United States Bureau of Reclamation dams